The BBC Sports Unsung Hero Award is an award given annually as part of the BBC Sports Personality of the Year ceremony each December. The award is given to the sportsperson who has made a substantive yet unrecognised contribution to sport. Sportspeople are nominated by the public, and must be aged 16 years or over on 1 January that year. Nominees may not put themselves forward or be nominated by a member of their immediate family. A nominee must actively help others participate in a sport at any level on a voluntary basis. The work they do must not be part of their job or take part within their places of work, and they must not be a participant in the sporting group they are helping. Previous winners of the award are ineligible for nomination. One winner is selected from each of the twelve BBC English Regions, and the three national regions: BBC Scotland, BBC Wales, and BBC Northern Ireland. A judging panel then chooses the Unsung Hero winner from the fifteen regional winners.

The inaugural winner in 2003 was 63-year-old Nobby Woodcock, for "his unstinting work with grassroots football in Wales". Of the fourteen recipients to date, four were chosen for their contributions to football; the other recipients contributed towards boxing, basketball, athletics, swimming, and the Special Olympics. Three of the fourteen winners have each been put forward from the BBC East Midlands and BBC South regions, and two from the BBC East region.  The other winners came from the BBC London, BBC North West, BBC Northern Ireland, BBC Scotland, BBC West Midlands and BBC Wales regions. The most recent award was presented in 2022 to Mike Alden.

Winners

By year

By region 
This table lists the total number of awards won by the BBC Region through which the recipient qualified for the award.

By sport 
This table lists the total number of awards won by the sport the recipient contributed towards.

References 

General

Specific

Unsung Hero
Awards established in 2003
2003 establishments in the United Kingdom